Events in the year 2019 in Uzbekistan.

Incumbents
 President: Shavkat Mirziyoyev
 Prime Minister: Abdulla Aripov

Events
2019 Uzbekistan Super League
2 February – The Agency for Information and Mass Communication is established
11 February – President Mirziyoyev fired SNB head Ikhtiyor Abdullayev after he was accused of conducting surveillance on President Mirziyoyev's personal phone.
18 to 21 April – South Korean President Moon Jae In conducts a state visit to Tashkent 
23 to 28 April – 2019 Asian Cycling Championships in Tashkent
2019 FC Bunyodkor season
12 April – President Mirziyoyev names his daughter Saida, as the deputy director of the Agency for Information and Mass Communication.
10 June – the 14th annual edition of AgroExpo Uzbekistan will take place

References

 
2010s in Uzbekistan
Years of the 21st century in Uzbekistan
Uzbekistan
Uzbekistan